Joseph William Brophy (5 April 1890 – 25 September 1972) was an Australian rules footballer who played with Fitzroy in the Victorian Football League (VFL).

Notes

External links 

		
1890 births		
1972 deaths		
Australian rules footballers from Victoria (Australia)		
Fitzroy Football Club players